Elektromos Futball Club was a Hungarian football club from the town of Budapest.

History
Elektromos FC debuted in the 1936–37 season of the Hungarian League and finished ninth.

Name Changes 
1921–1936: Budapest Székesfőváros Elektromos Műveinek Testedző Egyesülete
1936–1944: Elektromos FC
1944–1945: Elektromos MTE
1945–1951: Elektromos Munkás Sportegyesület
1948: merger with Kelenföldi Elektromos 
1950: merger with Phöbus FC
1951–1957: Vasas Elektromos SK
1957–1999: Elektromos SE

References

External links
 Profil

Football clubs in Hungary
1921 establishments in Hungary
Association football clubs established in 1921
1999 disestablishments in Hungary
Association football clubs disestablished in 1999